Malcolm Irving Wilson, OBE (born 17 February 1956) is a British former rally driver and current owner of team and constructor M-Sport. He is the father of former World Rally Championship driver Matthew Wilson. He has been married to Elaine Wilson since 1982.

Biography

He has over 20 years experience of rallying at world championship level, much of it with Ford. He drove for three factory teams in the world championship, including MG, in whose Group B Metro 6R4, he shared driving duties with fellow Briton, Tony Pond. He spent several years as Ford's chief test driver, developing new rally cars, including the short lived RS1700T and RS200 models.

As a driver, he won two British national titles in the late 1970s and achieved a long-held ambition by winning the British Rally Championship in 1994, all at the wheel of Ford Escorts.

He crashed during the 1980 Scottish Rally whilst chasing Hannu Mikkola and Ari Vatanen for the lead, breaking both his ankles and almost ending his career, but amazingly he recovered in time for the RAC Rally at the end of the year.

After his driving career, he went on to manage and run the Ford World Rally Team with his M-Sport operation, based at Dovenby Hall near Cockermouth in Cumbria, England.

Under his guidance, M-Sport (formerly Malcolm Wilson Motorsport) has become one of the world's leading rallying private teams, with a string of international titles and wins to its credit. The company now employs over 170 people.

Their work culminated in 2006 when Wilson led Ford to the World Rally Championship Constructors' title for the first time in 25 years; the team repeated this achievement in 2007.

In September 2008, Wilson took part in the Colin McRae Forest Stages Rally, a round of the Scottish Rally Championship centred in Perth in Scotland. He entered the event in a VK Vodka Kick sponsored Ford Escort RS1800 with co-driver Peter Martin. He was one of a number of ex-world and British champions to take part in the event in memory of McRae, who died in 2007.

Wilson was appointed Officer of the Order of the British Empire (OBE) in the 2009 Birthday Honours. In 2018 he was awarded with the V Class Order of the Cross of Terra Mariana for his services to Estonian motorsport, with his role in the successes of Markko Märtin and Ott Tänak cited.

Complete WRC results

See also
M-Sport

References

External links

M-Sport official website
Malcolm Wilson Rally homepage
Rallybase stats page
WRC Archive stats page

English rally drivers
World Rally Championship people
1956 births
Living people
World Rally Championship drivers
Officers of the Order of the British Empire
Ford Team RS
Audi Sport drivers
M-Sport drivers